The Southgate River is a river in the Pacific Ranges of the Coast Mountains in British Columbia, Canada, entering the head of Bute Inlet, on that province's South Coast, just east of the mouth of the Homathko River at Waddington Harbour.  The lower reaches of the river's course are flat-bottomed and are named Pigeon Valley.

Name origin
Its namesake was Captain James Johnson Southgate, a retired ship-master, who came to Victoria in 1859 via San Francisco and launched a commission and general mercantile business, largely in connection with the Pacific Station of the Royal Navy at Esquimalt, operating as J.J. Southgate & Co.  He sold the business and returned to England in 1865, but during his time in Victoria, he served as a member of the Legislative Assembly of Vancouver Island from 1860  to 1863, as the member for Saltspring Island.  He died in London in 1894.  The Southgate Group of islands are also named for him as is Southgate Island within that group.  The Southgate Glacier at the river's head, and Southgate Peak, which stands above its mouth, were named in association with the river.

Hydrology
The Bishop River enters it from the east after the first  of its course and has its origin at Ring Pass, which lies between the Compton Neve to the west and the Lillooet Icecap to the east and forms the divide with the uppermost Lillooet River.

Other major tributaries include Boulanger Creek, Elliot Creek, Icewall Creek, and Malim Creek.

History
The indigenous Homalco people have inhabited the watershed of the Southgate River since time immemorial.

2020 Elliot Creek Megatsunami
On 28 November 2020, unseasonably heavy rainfall triggered a landslide of  into a glacial lake at the head of Elliot Creek.

See also
Bishop River Provincial Park
Homathko Estuary Provincial Park
List of rivers of British Columbia

References

Rivers of the Pacific Ranges
South Coast of British Columbia